Tycho Brahe (1546–1601) was an influential Danish astronomer.

Tycho Brahe may also refer to:
 Tycho Brahe (Martian crater)
 Tycho Brahe Planetarium, a planetarium in Copenhagen, Denmark
 HEAT 1X Tycho Brahe, the first amateur, suborbital crewed spacecraft
 Tycho Brahé, a 1993 album by Lightwave
 Jerry Holkins or Tycho Brahe, writer of Penny Arcade
 MF Tycho Brahe, a Danish train and car ferry

See also
 Tycho (disambiguation)